Bonici is a Maltese surname, and may refer to:

People
 Giuseppe Bonici (1707–1779), Maltese architect
 Sharon Ellul-Bonici, Maltese politician

Places
 Villa Bonici, Sliema, Malta

See also
 Bonnici, a surname